The Diocese of Suwon (Lat.: Dioecesis Suvonensis) is a particular church of the Latin Church of the Catholic Church. The seat of the Bishop of Suwon is at Jeongjadong Cathedral in Suwon, Gyeonggi-do, South Korea.

Pope Paul VI created the episcopal see on October 7, 1963.  The territory had previously been part of the Archdiocese of Seoul, to which Suwon is suffragan.

Leadership

Ordinaries
Victorinus Youn Kong-hi (1963–1973), appointed Archbishop of Gwangju
Angelo Kim Nam-su (1974–1997)
Paul Choi Deok-ki (1997–2009)
Matthias Ri Iong-hoon (2009–present)

Coadjutor Bishops
Paul Choi Deok-ki (1996–1997)
Matthias Ri Iong-hoon (2008–2009)

Auxiliary Bishops
Matthias Ri Iong-hoon (2003–2008)
Linus Lee Seong-hyo (2011–present)
John Moon Hee-jong (2015–present)

References

External links
 Catholic Diocese of Suwon official site

Gyeonggi Province
Suwon
Christian organizations established in 1963
Suwon
Suwon
Roman Catholic Ecclesiastical Province of Seoul